The Anglican Network in Canada (ANiC) is a group of Anglican churches in Canada and the United States established in 2005 under the jurisdiction of the Anglican Province of the Southern Cone, a province of the Anglican Communion. It was a founding diocese of the Anglican Church in North America in June 2009. It comprises 74 parishes in nine Canadian provinces, Alberta, British Columbia, Saskatchewan, Manitoba, New Brunswick, Newfoundland & Labrador, Nova Scotia, Ontario, Quebec, and two American states, Massachusetts and Vermont. The Canadian provinces with more parishes are British Columbia, with 24, and Ontario, with 26. Their first Moderator Bishop was Don Harvey, from 2009 to 2014, when he was succeeded by Charlie Masters.

Structure
The Anglican Network in Canada aims to represent orthodox Anglicanism in Canada as an alternative to the liberal leaning theology of the Anglican Church of Canada, in particular to their views on homosexuality and blessing of same-sex unions. The Anglican Network in Canada is a major Canadian constituent of the Anglican realignment movement. The irregular nature of ANiC makes it the geographically largest Anglican diocese in the world, covering the entire territory of Canada and a small pocket in the northeastern United States, in Massachusetts and Vermont. The Anglican Network in Canada is under the ecclesiastical oversight of the Anglican Church of the Southern Cone of America, it also holds a position in the house of bishops in the Anglican Church in North America. At present, the Anglican Church of North America is in the process of trying to gain admittance into and obtaining official recognition from the Anglican Communion. Until that may happen, the Anglican Network in Canada will hold a "dual citizenship" in both the ACNA and the Anglican Province of the Southern Cone.

Although ANiC is primarily a Canadian church, a number of churches in the United States are also part of it. This "no borders" attitude rests on a close relationship between these parishes and Bishop Harvey, the Moderator of the ANiC. The Anglican Network in Canada is also affiliated with Anglican Essentials Canada and has a loose affiliation with the Anglican Coalition in Canada which is a part of the Anglican Mission in the Americas, a former missionary organization of the Province of the Anglican Church of Rwanda.

Beliefs
The stated mission of the Anglican Network in Canada is to "Build Biblically faithful, Gospel sharing, Anglican Churches". The network desires to build new churches and expand existing churches that it believes will be fully Anglican, biblically faithful, evangelizing and discipling.

The Anglican Network upholds what it believes to be the historical, biblical and traditional Christian beliefs found in the Anglican tradition pertaining to the Holy Trinity, sexuality, and authority of Christian scripture. The ANiC also affirms the Chicago-Lambeth Quadrilateral of 1886/1888 and the Jerusalem Declaration of GAFCON 2008. While women can be priests they cannot be ordained as bishops in the church. The ANiC does not bless same-sex unions or marriages. The ANiC does opposes abortion and euthanasia.

Worship style
The Anglican Network in Canada has a policy which allows churches to continue using the style of liturgy that they had been using at the time of joining the network. Until the network creates and publishes its own authorized liturgy, the majority of churches will continue to use the 1962 Book of Common Prayer and the 1985 Book of Alternative Services authorized by the Anglican Church of Canada. The Anglican Network in Canada is involved in church planting.

Most churches within the Anglican Network of Canada celebrate the Holy Communion (Eucharist) at least once a week, with many churches holding multiple services. Many churches use a wide variety of contemporary Christian music in worship. Congregations are frequently be involved in ecumenical and "wider church" initiatives, often partnering with other local churches and denominations for charitable, outreach, and evangelical initiatives.

Within the Anglican Network in Canada, there exists a wide diversity of worship styles. There are some churches in ANiC which identify as High Church and Anglo-Catholic, such as Holy Trinity Anglican Church in Marlborough, Massachusetts, and the Anglican Church of the Good Samaritan in St. John's, Newfoundland and Labrador, while there are churches at the other end of the spectrum which identify as low church and evangelical, such as St. John's Vancouver. Some other churches have a middle position and incorporate both high and low church styles into their worship, such as St. Peter & St. Paul's Anglican Church (formerly St George's Anglican Church) in Ottawa.

Media attention and legal troubles

The Anglican Network has gained a degree of media attention in two respects. Firstly, the network upholds traditional Christian understandings of morality including what it believes are the orthodox Biblical ideas about family, marriage and discipleship. The network has been criticized by the mainline Anglican Church of Canada, the Canadian media, secular interest groups and other liberal, mainline denominations for taking a stand against same-sex unions and same-sex marriage.

Secondly, many parishes in the network are involved in legal battles with their former Anglican dioceses. This includes many established, vibrant and larger churches being sued by the Anglican Church of Canada for possession of their church buildings and trust funds attached to them.

Leadership
The Moderator of the Anglican Network in Canada is Dan Gifford.

Primates
 Foley Beach, the Archbishop and Primate of the Anglican Church in North America.
 Gregory Venables, the Archbishop and Presiding Bishop of the Anglican Church of South America (a member church of the Anglican Communion). This carries forward from his offer of jurisdiction to Anglicans who wished to leave the Anglican Church of Canada and the Episcopal Church in the United States while also remaining members of the Anglican Communion.

Active Bishops
 Dan Gifford (moderator; area bishop for western Canada); Vancouver, British Columbia
 Stephen Leung (suffragan bishop; area bishop for Asian and multicultural ministry); Vancouver, British Columbia

Retired Bishops
 William Anderson (retired bishop; joined in November 2017)
 Ronald Ferris (retired assisting bishop)
 Malcolm Harding (retired assisting bishop)
 Don Harvey (retired moderator bishop)
 Trevor Walters (retired area bishop for western Canada)
 Charlie Masters (retired moderator bishop and area bishop for eastern Canada)

Former bishops
 Terry Buckle; Whitehorse, Yukon (joined in July 2018; deceased 2020)

The ANiC synod, held at St. Peter and St. Paul Anglican Church in Ottawa, elected on 14 November 2012 Charlie Masters as co-adjutor diocesan bishop to succeed Don Harvey as Moderator Bishop upon his retirement in 2014. Masters' enthronement took place on 6 November 2014.

The most prominent member of the Anglican Network in Canada was J. I. Packer, who is a leading theologian in the Anglican and North American evangelical world. He was the assistant pastor of St. John's Vancouver and a professor of theology at Regent College. During his lifetime, Packer was considered the theologian emeritus of the Anglican Network in Canada.

The Anglican Network in Canada has received strong support from several members of the Anglican Communion, such as the former Bishop of Rochester in the Church of England, Michael Nazir-Ali (who was received into the Roman Catholic Church and ordained as a priest for the Ordinariate of Our Lady of Walsingham on 30 October 2021), who spoke at the 2010 Anglican Network synod at St. Paul University and at St. Peter & St. Paul's Anglican Church (formerly St. George's Anglican Church) in Ottawa, Ontario. Support has been received from other leaders in the Anglican Communion, including from the Global South (Anglican) Primates.

Reaction to Roman Catholic personal ordinariates
In October 2009, ANiC's leadership reacted to the Roman Catholic Church's proposed creation of personal ordinariates for disaffected traditionalist Anglicans by saying that this provision would probably not have a great impact on its laity and clergy, who are satisfied with the Anglican realignment movement. In June 2013, at least one priest from the ANIC denomination has accepted the offer to become a Catholic priest. Furthermore, Bishop Don Harvey stated that "Apart from being an intrusion at the very highest levels of one major church into the internal affairs of another, under the guise of being ecumenical, this invitation offers very little that is new."

Relations with other churches
ANiC is a member of the Evangelical Fellowship of Canada. ANiC has established ecumenical contacts with the Lutheran Church-Canada. It is also has been involved in ecumenical dialogue with other Lutheran and Christian church bodies as part of the ACNA.

See also
Anglican Essentials Canada
Anglican realignment

References

External links
 

Dioceses of the Anglican Church in North America
Anglican realignment dioceses
Evangelicalism in Canada
Christian organizations established in 2005